is a 1968 Japanese action film directed by Tadahiki Isomi.

The film was produced by Shouhei Imamura. He was also in charge of the screenplay. The lead star is Masakazu Tamura.

Synopsis
Chiba Rokurō starts a part-time job on a fishing boat. But the ship has an engine failure in the middle of the Pacific Ocean, the ship manages to arrive at Naha Port in Okinawa.

Cast
 Masakazu Tamura as Chiba Rokurō
 Tetsuya Watari as Tamashiro Naoyoshi
 Ryōhei Uchida as Katayama Kunigorō
 Kanjūrō Arashi as Old Guy
 Haruko Kato as Rokurō's mother
 Yukie Kagawa as Tamaki Kana
 Hitoshi Omae as Kamata Yasuo
 Taiji Tonoyama

References

External links
 

Nikkatsu films
Seafaring films
Sea adventure films
Films set on ships
1960s Japanese films